Alexandre Monteiro de Lima (born 15 December 1988), simply known as Alex, is a Brazilian professional footballer who plays as a midfielder for Indian Super League club East Bengal.

Club career
Alex began his career in the youth system of Grêmio Mauaense. In 2008, he left Brazil to sign with FC Wohlen in Switzerland. During the 2009/10 season he was loaned to Gossau. He returned to Wohlen the following season and became a regular starter for the club as he made 48 league appearances and scored six goals in two seasons.

On April 26, 2012, Alex signed a deal with Chicago Fire of Major League Soccer. He officially joined the squad on June 27, 2012 with the opening of the summer transfer window.  As of April 13, 2015, he was traded to the Houston Dynamo.

Alex was released by Houston at the end of their 2017 season. He later signed for K League 2 side Suwon FC.

In 2020, he moved to India and signed for the Indian Super League side Jamshedpur FC, for which he appeared in 11 matches of the 2020–21 season. He scored his first goal on 6 December 2021 against ATK Mohun Bagan in their 2–1 win.

East Bengal 
In August 2022, Alex was announced as one of the five foreigners signed by East Bengal for the upcoming season.

On 22 August, he made his debut against Indian Navy in the Durand Cup, which ended in a 0–0 stalemate. He came on as a half-time substitute for Mobashir Rahman.

Career statistics

Club

Honours

Jamshedpur
Indian Super League Premiers: 2021-22

Personal life
Alex received his U.S. green card in June 2014. This qualifies him as a domestic player for MLS roster purposes.

References

External links
 

1988 births
Living people
Brazilian footballers
Brazilian expatriate footballers
FC Wohlen players
FC Gossau players
Chicago Fire FC players
Houston Dynamo FC players
Suwon FC players
FC Anyang players
Expatriate footballers in Switzerland
Expatriate soccer players in the United States
Expatriate footballers in South Korea
Swiss Challenge League players
Major League Soccer players
K League 2 players
Brazilian expatriate sportspeople in the United States
Brazilian expatriate sportspeople in South Korea
Association football midfielders
Jamshedpur FC players
Footballers from São Paulo